Blackspot can refer to:

A campaign by Adbusters
Accident blackspot
Apple scab or Pear scab

Animals:
Blackspot climbing perch
Blackspot shark
Blackspot skate
Blackspot tuskfish

See also
 Black spot (disambiguation)
 Blackmark (disambiguation)